Ryan Carr may refer to:
 Ryan Carr (rugby league)
 Ryan Carr (footballer)